Snehlata Shamrao Deshmukh also spelt as Snehalata was the Vice Chancellor of the University of Mumbai from 1995–2000. She was dean of the Sion hospital. She is an eminent paediatric surgeon in India. She was a pioneer and one of the founders of the neo-natal department of KEM Hospital.

Dr Snehlata Deshmukh is also a co-opted member of Governing Council at the prestigious Tata Memorial Centre, a grant in aid institution under the Administrative control of Department of Atomic Energy, GOI.

References 

University of Mumbai people
Possibly living people
Year of birth missing
Indian paediatric surgeons
Indian women surgeons